Châtillon-sur-Thouet (literally Châtillon on Thouet) is a village and commune in the Deux-Sèvres department of the Nouvelle-Aquitaine region in western France. The village is situated on the river Thouet to the north of the town of Parthenay, with which it forms a contiguous built-up area.

The commune of Châtillon-sur-Thouet has joined together with 38 neighbouring communes to establish the Communauté de communes de Parthenay-Gâtine which provides a framework within which local tasks are carried out together.

See also
Communes of the Deux-Sèvres department

References

Communes of Deux-Sèvres